Franciszek Antoni Kwilecki (1725–1794) was a Polish nobleman, castelan of Kalisz, marshal of the Crown Tribunal (1766), member of the Bar Confederation (1768–1771), Polish envoy to Berlin (1771–1776), deputy to the Sejms of 1761, 1764 and the Great Sejm (1788–1792), which he opened on behalf of Stanisław Kostka Gadomski. Supporter of the Constitution of the 3rd May to which he was a signatory. Starost of Wschowa.

He had a daughter, Marianna, and a son, Antoni, who was also an envoy at the Great Sejm and the first husband of Wirydianna Fiszerowa, who wrote the latter's speeches.

Kwilecki was a recipient of the Order of the White Eagle and the Order of Saint Stanislaus. In 1776, he also received the Order of St. Anna.

References

Secular senators of the Polish–Lithuanian Commonwealth
1725 births
1794 deaths
Bar confederates
Polish nobility
Signers of the Polish Constitution of May 3, 1791
Recipients of the Order of the White Eagle (Poland)